The Weisshorn (from German: white peak) is a mountain located in the Pennine Alps. It is also the name of several other mountains:

Switzerland
Aroser Weisshorn, in the Plessur Alps
Weisshorn (Bernese Alps), in the Bernese Alps
Flüela Wisshorn, in the Silvretta Alps
Italy (South Tyrol)
Weißhorn (South Tyrol), in the Südtiroler Unterland 
Penser Weißhorn, in the Sarntal Alps